Wang Bit-na (born April 15, 1981) is a South Korean actress. She is best known for playing Bu-yong in the popular historical drama Hwang Jini.

Filmography

Film

Television series

Awards
2018 Korea Drama Awards: Top Excellence Award, Actress (Mysterious Personal Shopper)<
2013 SBS Drama Awards: Excellence Award, Actress in a Weekend/Daily Drama (Two Women's Room)
2007 SBS Drama Awards: New Star Award
2006 KBS Drama Awards: Best Supporting Actress (Hwang Jini)

References

External links
Wang Bit-na at Will Entertainment 

1981 births
Living people
South Korean television actresses
South Korean film actresses
South Korean female models
Chung-Ang University alumni